Leaf Cay Airport  is a private use airport located near Leaf Cay, the Bahamas.

See also
List of airports in the Bahamas

References

External links 
 Airport record for Leaf Cay Airport at Landings.com

Airports in the Bahamas